Goran Tomasevic (born 21 June 1990) is an Australian water polo player.

Tomasevic was picked in the water polo Sharks squad to compete in the men's water polo tournament at the 2020 Summer Olympics. Coached by  Elvis Fatović, the team finished joint fourth on points in their pool but their inferior goal average meant they finished fifth overall and out of medal contention. They were able to upset Croatia in a group stage match 11–8. Australia at the 2020 Summer Olympics details the results in depth.

Born in Croatia, Tomasevic played NCAA Division I water polo at the University of the Pacific before moving to Australia, where he became a citizen in 2021.

References

External links
 Pacific Tigers bio

1990 births
Living people
Australian male water polo players
Croatian male water polo players
Olympic water polo players of Australia
Water polo players at the 2020 Summer Olympics
Pacific Tigers men's water polo players
Croatian emigrants to Australia
Australian people of Croatian descent
Water polo players from Split, Croatia
Naturalised citizens of Australia